Long track may mean:
Long track motorcycle racing
Long track speed skating
P-40 radar, a Soviet 3-D UHF radar
Long Tack Sam (1884–1961), a Chinese-born American magician and acrobat

See also
Track (disambiguation)